Triodiinae is a subtribe of grasses plants in the tribe Cynodonteae.

References

Plant subtribes
Chloridoideae